Ascension St. Mary's Hospital (formerly St. Mary's of Michigan Medical Center) is a hospital in Saginaw, Michigan, United States. Ascension St. Mary's is certified as a Comprehensive Stroke Center by The Joint Commission. The hospital is a member of Ascension Michigan, and is a teaching affiliate of the Michigan State University College of Human Medicine as well as Central Michigan University. The American College of Surgeons verified the emergency department as a level II trauma center.  The 268-bed hospital includes various specialty services, including neurological surgery, oncology and orthopedics.

Affiliations
Ascension St. Mary's is affiliated locally with the Field Neurosciences Institute, a neurological educational and research facility located in nearby Saginaw Township.  Teaching affiliates include Michigan State University's College of Human Medicine and Central Michigan University.

Facilities
In addition to the hospital medical center, Ascension St. Mary's manages outpatient facilities in the area including physician offices and various services such as physical therapy, laboratory and radiology.  Towne Centre, an ambulatory care center located in Saginaw Township, provides for outpatient treatment and surgeries as well as staffing a 24-hour urgent care emergency department.

History
In 1873, the pastor of St. Mary's Catholic Church in East Saginaw, Fr. Francis van der Bom, requested that the Daughters of Charity of Saint Vincent de Paul open a hospital in Saginaw.  The facility opened after the arrival of four sisters of the Daughters of Charity on August 22, 1874. The original frame building on the east side of Saginaw soon proved inadequate; in 1875 a new building was begun on the site and the hospital incorporated as St. Mary's. Its first patients were principally injured lumbermen. The staff devised a health insurance plan of $5 a year to raise funds.

The hospital continued to expand and modernize to care for more patients as well as to provide an increasing variety of medical and educational facilities. In 1928, a new building was dedicated, adding an emergency room, 4 operating rooms, a medical library, and bringing the total of beds to 156.  A new facility was opened in 1961, following the demolition of the 1892 building.

Flightcare, a medical emergency helicopter transfer service, was based at St. Mary's beginning in 1987.  The St. Mary's burn unit was opened in 1975.  The first open heart surgery in the region was performed at St. Mary's on Sept. 10, 1984.

On November 1, 1999, the Daughters of Charity National Health System merged with the Sisters of Saint Joseph to form Ascension Health.  The Saginaw hospital was renamed as Ascension Saint Mary's.

Trauma Program

St. Mary's of Michigan trauma program received re-verification as a Level II Trauma Center in 2014 by the Verification Review Committee
(VRC), an ad hoc committee of the Committee on Trauma (COT) of the American College of Surgeons (ACS). This achievement
recognizes the trauma center's dedication to providing optimal care for injured patients.

St. Mary's Level II Trauma Program was the first ACS Verified Level II Trauma Center in the
region. St. Mary's Trauma team provides care for adult patients, serving the mid-northern counties of Michigan. “We treat patients who have the most severe life threatening injuries,” said the former medical director of St. Mary's Trauma Center. “Our team of surgeons, physicians, nurses and technicians work with medical specialists from all aspects of care to provide the best possible care for the victim of injury. The teamwork between all members of the trauma team is what allows us to provide quality care to each patient.”

The Verification Program for Hospitals promotes the development of trauma centers in which participants provide not only the
hospital resources necessary for trauma care, but also the entire spectrum of care to address the needs of all injured patients.
Verified trauma centers must meet the essential criteria that ensure trauma care capability and institutional performance, as
outlined by the American College of Surgeons’ Committee on Trauma in its current Resources for Optimal Care of the Injured
Patient manual.

References

External links
Ascension Saint Mary's Hospital website
Ascension Health website

Hospital buildings completed in 1892
Hospital buildings completed in 1928
Catholic hospitals in North America
Hospitals in Michigan
1875 establishments in Michigan
Trauma centers